Copella compta is a species of fish in the splashing tetra family found in the upper Rio Negro basin, as well as the Orinoco Basin. They grow no more than a few centimeters.

References

External links
 

Fish of Brazil
Fish of Venezuela
Fish of Colombia
Taxa named by George S. Myers
Fish described in 1927
Lebiasinidae